Cultura is the word for culture in Latin and other languages such as Spanish. It may refer to:

TV Cultura
NPO Cultura
Cultura (journal), a biannual peer-reviewed academic journal which covers philosophical work
Cultura (album), album by Breed 77
Cultura en Vivo, live album by the Puerto Rican reggae band Cultura Profética